David I was the 49th Catholicos-Patriarch of the Armenian Apostolic Church between 728 and 741. He was from Aramus (then called Aramonk) in the district of Kotayk. He moved the Armenian Apostolic Church's Holy See from Dvin to Aramonk due to Dvin's fall to Arab hands and problems which resulted from that. Catholicos David built a church and patriarchal residence there, near which he was buried upon his death.

Catholicoi of Armenia
Catholicos David I
Year of birth unknown
8th-century Oriental Orthodox archbishops